The Founders' Memorial is a memorial under development within the Bay East Garden of the Gardens by the Bay to commemorate the founding fathers of Singapore as well as to cover the country's contemporary history from after World War II to its first few decades of independence.

On 9 March 2020, a collaboration between Kengo Kuma (Japan) and K2LD Architects (Singapore) won the international architectural competition to design the memorial. Initially expected to open in 2025, the memorial is now scheduled to open in 2027 due to the COVID-19 pandemic.

History
Singapore's first Prime Minister, Lee Kuan Yew, died on 23 March 2015. Lee had made it clear over the years that he did not want a monument solely to himself, and his will specified that his house at 38 Oxley Road was to be demolished. In a parliamentary statement on 13 April 2015, his son Prime Minister Lee Hsien Loong stated:

The site was selected in 2018, after choosing between Gardens by the Bay and Fort Canning Park.

Design competition
A design competition was launched in January 2018, attracting 193 local and international architects. The first stage of judging was an anonymous process, lasting 12 weeks until 5 April. The names of the five entrants moving to the next stage was only revealed to the seven-member jury panel after being shortlisted.

The five entries selected for the second stage were:  Kengo Kuma & Associates, and K2LD Architects (collaboration); 8DGE Design, and Ong Ching Ying (collaboration); Cox Architecture, and Architects 61 (collaboration); DP Architects; Johnson Pilton Walker.

On 9 March 2020, the collaboration between Kengo Kuma (Japan) and K2LD Architects (Singapore) was announced as winner of the architectural competition to design the memorial. Initially planned to open in 2025, it has been rescheduled for 2027 due to the COVID-19 pandemic.

Transportation
Once completed, the Memorial will be served via a train service by the namesake Founders' Memorial station on the Thomson–East Coast line.

See also

Early Founders Memorial Stone
History of Singapore
Timeline of Singaporean history
 Architecture Design Competition

References

Kengo Kuma buildings
History of Singapore
Landmarks in Singapore
Monuments and memorials in Singapore